St. Patrick's Church, Saint Patrick's Church, St. Patrick's Roman Catholic Church or Saint Patrick's Roman Catholic Church, and similar, may refer to:

Australia
 St Patrick's Church, Adelaide, a heritage-listed church in Adelaide, South Australia
 St Patrick's Catholic Church, Brandon, a heritage-listed former church in Shire of Burdekin, Queensland
 St Patricks Church, Fortitude Valley, a heritage-listed church in Brisbane, Queensland
 St Patrick's Church, Rosevale, a heritage-listed church in the Scenic Rim Region, Queensland
 St Patrick's Church, Mount Perry, a heritage-listed church in the North Burnett Region, Queensland
 St. Patrick's Catholic Church, Yungaburra, a heritage-listed church in the Tablelands Region, Queensland

Canada
 St. Patrick's Roman Catholic Church (Calgary), Alberta
 St. Patrick's Church (Carbonear), Newfoundland
 St. Patrick's Church, St John's, Newfoundland
 St. Patrick's Church, Halifax, Nova Scotia
 St. Patrick's Church (Toronto), Ontario
 St. Patrick's Church (Quebec City), Quebec
 St. Patrick's Basilica, Montreal, Quebec

Grenada
 St. Patrick's Church, Carriacou

India
 St. Patrick Church, Siddakatte, Karnataka

Ireland

County Dublin
St. Patrick's Church, Ringsend

County Louth
St. Patrick's Church, Dundalk

County Kildare
St. Patrick's Church, Straffan

Isle of Man
 St. Patrick's Church, Jurby

Montserrat
 St. Patrick's Church, Lookout

United Kingdom
 St Patrick's Church, Bolton, Greater Manchester
 St Patrick's Church, Bradford, West Yorkshire
 St Patrick's Church, Hove, East Sussex
 St Patrick's Church, Huddersfield, West Yorkshire
 St Patrick's Church, Leeds, West Yorkshire
 St Patrick's Church, Liverpool, Merseyside
 St Patrick's Church, Newport, Wales
 Our Lady of Mount Carmel and St Patrick Church, Oldham, Greater Manchester
 St Patrick's Church, Patrington, East Yorkshire
 St Patrick's Church, Preston Patrick, Cumbria
 St Patrick's Church, Soho Square, London
 St Patrick's Church, Waterloo, London

United States
(by state then city)
 St. Patrick's Catholic Church (Loxley, Alabama), listed on the National Register of Historic Places (NRHP)
 St. Patrick's Roman Catholic Church (Bisbee, Arizona), listed on the NRHP
 St. Patrick Catholic Church (Los Angeles, California)
 St. Patrick's Catholic Church, San Francisco
 St. Patrick Mission Church, Denver, Colorado, listed on the NRHP
 St. Patrick's Church (Bridgeport, Connecticut)
 St. Patrick's Church, Hartford, Connecticut, included in Ann Street Historic District
 St. Patrick's Catholic Church (Washington, D.C.)
 St. Patrick's Episcopal Church (Washington, D.C.)
 St. Patrick Catholic Church (Miami Beach, Florida)
 Saint Patrick Catholic Church, Honolulu, Hawaii
 Old St. Patrick's Church (Chicago), listed on the NRHP
 St. Patrick's Roman Catholic Church (Lagro, Indiana), listed on the NRHP in Indiana
 St. Patrick's Catholic Church, Cedar, listed on the NRHP in Iowa
 St. Patrick's Church (Cumming, Iowa), listed on the NRHP
 Saint Patrick's Church (Dubuque, Iowa)
 St. Patrick's Church-Garryowen, listed on the NRHP in Iowa
 St. Patrick's Catholic Church (Georgetown, Iowa), listed on the NRHP
 St. Patrick Church (Imogene, Iowa), listed on the NRHP
 Saint Patrick's Church (Iowa City, Iowa)
 St. Patrick's Catholic Church (Perry, Iowa), listed on the NRHP
 St. Patrick's Catholic Church (Atchison, Kansas), listed on the NRHP
 St. Patrick's Catholic Church (Louisville, Kentucky), listed on the NRHP
 St. Patrick's Church (New Orleans, Louisiana), listed on the NRHP
 St. Patrick's Catholic Church (West Pointe à la Hache, Louisiana), listed on the NRHP
 St. Patrick's Catholic Church (Newcastle, Maine), listed on the NRHP
 St. Patrick's Church (Fall River, Massachusetts), listed on the NRHP
 St. Patrick's Church (Lowell, Massachusetts), listed on the NRHP
 St. Patrick's Parish Complex, listed on the NRHP in Ann Arbor, Michigan
 Chapel of St. Theresa-the Little Flower, Detroit, Michigan (known as St. Patrick Church)
 St. Patrick's Catholic Church (Meridian, Mississippi)
 Old St. Patrick's Church (Gravois Mills, Missouri), listed on the NRHP in Missouri
 St. Patrick's Parish and Buildings, listed on the NRHP in Jersey City, New Jersey
 St. Patrick's Parochial Residence-Convent and School, listed on the NRHP in Elmira, New York
 St. Patrick's Cathedral (Manhattan)
 St. Patrick's Church (Staten Island, New York)
 St. Patrick's Church (Syracuse, New York)
 St. Pius X Catholic Church (Cincinnati, Ohio), formerly St. Patrick's Church, listed on the NRHP
 Saint Patrick Church (Columbus, Ohio)
 St. Patrick's Catholic Church (Glynwood, Ohio), listed on the NRHP
 St. Patrick's Catholic Church and School, (Kent, Ohio)
 St. Patrick's Catholic Church (St. Patrick, Ohio), listed on the NRHP
 St. Patrick's Catholic Church (Toledo, Ohio), listed on the NRHP
 St. Patrick's Catholic Church (Wellington, Ohio), listed on the NRHP as Old St. Patrick's Church
 Saint Patrick's Roman Catholic Church (Independence, Oregon), listed on the NRHP
 St. Patrick Catholic Church (Portland, Oregon), listed on the NRHP in Portland, Oregon
 St. Patrick's Roman Catholic Church (Cowansville, Pennsylvania), listed on the NRHP
 St. Patrick Church (Kennett Square, Pennsylvania)
 St. Patrick's Catholic Church and Rectory, listed on the NRHP in Nashville, Tennessee
 St. Patrick's Roman Catholic Church (Adell, Wisconsin), listed on the NRHP
 Saint Patrick's Church (Benton, Wisconsin)
 St. Patrick's Church (Eau Claire, Wisconsin), listed on the NRHP
 St. Patrick's Roman Catholic Church (Madison, Wisconsin), listed on the NRHP
 St. Patrick's Roman Catholic Church (Milwaukee, Wisconsin), listed on the NRHP
 St. Patrick's Roman Catholic Church (Racine, Wisconsin), listed on the NRHP

See also
 St. Patrick's Cathedral (disambiguation), including St. Patrick's Basilica

cs:Svatý Patrik (kostel)